Yaovabha Bongsanid (28 August 1884 – 13 June 1934) was the Princess of Siam (later Thailand). She was a member of Siamese Royal Family. She was a daughter of Chulalongkorn, King Rama V of Siam.

Princess Yaovabha Bongsanid of Siam was born on 28 August 1884 at the Grand Palace. She was the forty-seventh daughter of King Chulalongkorn of Siam (Rama V the Great) and The Noble Consort (Chao Chom Manda) Mom Rajawongse Nueng Sanidvongs (daughter of Prince Sai Sanidvongs. She had a younger brother, Prince Rangsit Prayurasakdi, the Prince of Chainat Narendorn.

When their mother died on 23 November 1885, she and both her younger brother, Prince Rangsit Prayursakdi, were adopted by Queen Savang Vadhana, one of the King Chulalongkorn's queen consorts (who later became the Queen Aunt and Queen Grandmother).

Princess Yaovabha Bongsanid died on 13 June 1934 at the Grand Palace, at the age of 49 years and 11 months.

Royal Decorations
  Dame Cross of the Most Illustrious Order of Chula Chom Klao (First class): received 25 November 1906

Ancestry

1884 births
1934 deaths
19th-century Thai women
19th-century Chakri dynasty
20th-century Thai women
20th-century Chakri dynasty
Thai female Phra Ong Chao
Dames Grand Cross of the Order of Chula Chom Klao
Children of Chulalongkorn
Daughters of kings